"Goin' Down the Road" is a 1974 single, which was written and produced by Roy Wood. Wood played all of the musical instruments on the recording, including the bagpipes, as well as supplying lead and multi-tracked backing vocals. The single bore the subtitle "(A Scottish Reggae Song)". The song was globally published by Carlin Music Corp.

The track reached number 13 in the UK Singles Chart. The single remained in the UK chart for seven weeks, starting in June 1974. It was also released as a single in New Zealand, Germany, Sweden, Switzerland, and Ireland.

"Goin' Down the Road" has appeared on numerous compilation albums, including Wood's own Singles (1993, Connoisseur Records) and The Wizzard!: Greatest Hits & More - The EMI Years.

The record still commands national radio play in the UK; the most recent airing being on BBC Radio 2's Pick of the Pops on 13 July 2019.

References

External links
YouTube

Songs about roads
1974 songs
1974 singles
British pop songs
Songs written by Roy Wood
Song recordings produced by Roy Wood
Harvest Records singles